The second and last competition weekend of the 2020–21 ISU Speed Skating World Cup was held at Thialf in Heerenveen, the Netherlands, from Friday, 29 January, until Sunday, 31 January 2021.

Medal summary

Men's events

 In mass start, race points are accumulated during the race based on results of the intermediate sprints and the final sprint. The skater with most race points is the winner.

Women's events

 In mass start, race points are accumulated during the race based on results of the intermediate sprints and the final sprint. The skater with most race points is the winner.

References

External links
 

2
ISU World Cup, 2020-21, 2
Sports competitions in Heerenveen
ISU
ISU